Associazione Sportiva Dilettantistica Asti Calcio a 5 is a futsal club based in Asti, Piedmont, Italy.

History

Honors
 Coppa Italia:  2012, 2015
Winter Cup: 2014, 2015

Famous players
 Gabriel Lima
 Alessandro Patias

External links
  
Former Official Website 

Futsal clubs in Italy
Football clubs in Piedmont and Aosta Valley
2005 establishments in Italy
Futsal clubs established in 2005
Asti